Manpur is a block in Gaya District, India. The town is known for its handloom and railroad tie factory. It is situated on the banks of the Phalgu river. It is a country town where the people from the remote villages do their shopping. The main market is known as Manpur Bazaar. The main occupation of the people are business and handloom weaving Weaving of clothes through hand loom and power loom is done mainly in Patwatoli.

Patwatoli, a muhalla in Manpur, has produced many IITians almost 20 each year Indian Institutes of Technology and about every house has an engineer. Now these days, students are opting other streams too like Law, UPSC, SSC, Medical etc. Due to higher education in Patwatoli, Child marriage is about to end and Girls also going out for higher education.

History
There is also a very ancient temple of Lord Sun in Manpur named as Surya Temple, which is situated on the bank of a pond. The Surya Temple was established around 400 years ago by Raja Man Singh, an army chief of the Mughal Emperor Akbar as well as king of Amer. Raja Man Singh, during his campaign to quell Bengal riots, established Manpur; that's why it is named as Man-pur. Patwatoli, near the Shiv Mandir, Sri Ram Nagar, Durga Asthan and Shivcharan Lane, has the highest number of power looms installed. There are almost 5000- 8000 power looms set up.

Manpur is also famous for Diwali and almost hundreds of statues of Goddess Lakshmi, Lord Ganesha and Goddess Saraswati are worshipped and decorated on the occasion of Diwali. People from all over Manpur as well as Gaya town come out of their houses in Diwali to see the very well decorated statues. On 2nd day of Diwali people roam around the patwatoli for Pandal Hoping.

Transport
Manpur is connected by train with various cities of Bihar. The nearest two station namely Manpur Junction and Shaheed Ishwar Chowdhary Halt railway station is situated on Gaya–Kiul line.

References

Cities and towns in Gaya district
Community development blocks in Gaya district